The Artaud Beats is a progressive rock band consisting of John Greaves (bass, vocals), Chris Cutler (drums) and Geoff Leigh (soprano sax, flute, vocals, electronics), all formerly members of Henry Cow, and Yumi Hara Cawkwell (piano, vocals).

History
Cawkwell and Leigh had released an album together, Upstream, and were booked to play the Avantgarde Festival (Schiphorst, Germany) in 2009 having previously toured Japan. Cutler and Greaves were both attending the same festival to play with the Peter Blegvad Trio and Dagmar Krause. However, the four decided to play an improvised set together in Cawkwell and Leigh's slot as a partial Henry Cow reunion, under the name Not Henry Cow.

They returned to Japan in 2013 for fourteen concerts; in 2014 they performed at the first Rock in Opposition Festival in Tokyo, and the Fort Process experimental music festival in Newhaven, near Brighton, UK. The CD Logos was released in 2015 – they played a presentation concert in Paris.

Discography
Logos, 2015, Bonobo's Ark Records: BAR004

References

External links
Official Facebook page

Musical groups established in 2009
British progressive rock groups